Douglas Santos may refer to:

 Douglas Marques dos Santos, or Douglas Santos (born 1985), Brazilian footballer
 Douglas Pereira dos Santos, or Douglas Santos (born 1990), Brazilian footballer
 Douglas dos Santos Justino de Melo, or Douglas Santos (born 1994), Brazilian footballer
 Douglas Santos Costa (born 1990), Brazilian weightlifter